Praveen Kumar (born 15 May 2003 in Noida, Uttar Pradesh) is an Indian athlete (paralympian). He won silver medal in the  Men's high jump T64 event at the 2020 Summer Paralympics. He studied at Pragyan Public School Jewar ,  till Class 12th. He is a graduation student at Motilal Nehru College.

See also 
 India at the 2020 Summer Paralympics

References 

2003 births
Living people
Indian male high jumpers
Paralympic athletes of India
Paralympic silver medalists for India
Paralympic medalists in athletics (track and field)
Athletes (track and field) at the 2020 Summer Paralympics
Medalists at the 2020 Summer Paralympics
Recipients of the Arjuna Award